Ireland–Malaysia relations (Jawi: هوبوڠن أيرلندا–مليسيا) refers to a foreign relations between the two countries, Ireland and Malaysia. Ireland has an embassy in Kuala Lumpur, and Malaysia has an embassy in Dublin.

References 

 
Ireland
Malaysia
Malaysia
Ireland